The Ksour Range or Kçour Range (or Djebel Ksour) is a mountain range in Algeria. Stretching across the provinces of Béchar and El Bayadh, it is the westernmost range of the Saharan Atlas, with the Amour Range further east.

Geography
The range extends between Figuig Province in the Oriental Region of Morocco near the Moroccan/Algerian border and El Bayadh municipality in Algeria. The range pattern continues westwards as the High Atlas.
The highest summit of the range is 2,236 m high Mount Issa or Djebel Aïssa (جبل عيسى).

Rock art
Neolithic art, in the form of engraved stones representing horses, elephants and other animals, is found in different caves and walls throughout the range (such as at Thyout).

Protected areas
The Djebel Aissa National Park is a protected area within the limits of the mountain range since 2003.

Features

See also
List of mountains in Algeria
Saharan Atlas

References

External links

Parc du Djebel Aïssa (Nâama)
A. Bernard, Les régions naturelles de l'Algérie
Les montagnes d'atlas
Persée - Notes de géographie physique algérienne

Mountain ranges of the Atlas Mountains
Geography of El Bayadh Province
Geography of Béchar Province
Mountain ranges of Algeria